Kurt Aylett (born 2 April 1992) is a former professional Australian rules footballer who played for the Greater Western Sydney Giants and Essendon Football Club in the Australian Football League (AFL).

He was recruited in mid 2010 by  through zoning concessions. Aylett made his AFL debut in round 17, 2012 against . In October 2013 he was traded to Essendon along with Shaun Edwards for pick 48. Aylett made his Essendon debut in round 8 of the 2014 and started as the substitute.

Aylett was delisted at the conclusion of the 2014 season, however, he was re-drafted by Essendon in the rookie draft. He was delisted again at the conclusion of the 2015 season.
In 2019 he signed for Essendon VFL.

References

External links

1992 births
Living people
Greater Western Sydney Giants players
Essendon Football Club players
Australian rules footballers from New South Wales
People from the Riverina
Werribee Football Club players